The Power of the Night is the only album by hard rock group Metropolis. The album was released on May 9, 2000 through MTM Music Group. The song "The Darkest Side of the Night" was originally featured in the 1989 film Friday the 13th Part VIII: Jason Takes Manhattan.

Track listing
All songs written by Peter Fredette and Stan Meissner, except where noted.

Personnel
Credits adapted from AllMusic:
Metropolis
 Peter Fredette – bass, vocals
 Stan Meissner – drums, guitar, keyboards, vocals, producer

Additional personnel
 Nick Blagona – mastering
 Patrick Duffy – art direction, design 
 Rob Waymen – photography

References

2000 albums
MTM Records albums